José Herrada Lopez (born 1 October 1985) is a Spanish professional road bicycle racer, who currently rides for UCI WorldTeam .

Career
Herrada made his Grand Tour début at the 2012 Giro d'Italia; during the sixteenth stage, Herrada was part of the stage-long breakaway, and ended up finishing the stage in fifth place.

He was named in the start list for the 2015 Tour de France.

Major results

2005
 9th Overall Ruban Granitier Breton
2006
 10th Overall Vuelta a León
2007
 1st Stage 6 Tour de l'Avenir
 2nd Overall Tour des Pyrénées
1st Points classification
1st Mountains classification
1st Young rider classification
2009
 3rd Klasika Primavera
 6th Overall Vuelta a Asturias
2010
 1st  Overall Cinturó de l'Empordà
1st Stage 2
 1st Stage 5 Volta a Portugal
 3rd Overall Tour de Normandie
 4th Overall Circuito Montañés
 6th Overall Vuelta a Asturias
 7th Overall Vuelta a la Comunidad de Madrid
 8th Prueba Villafranca de Ordizia
 10th Subida al Naranco
 10th Klasika Primavera
2011
 4th Overall Route du Sud
 6th Overall Vuelta a Asturias
 7th Gran Premio de Llodio
 9th Prueba Villafranca de Ordizia
 10th Overall Vuelta a Murcia
2013
 5th Klasika Primavera
2014
 1st Stage 1 (TTT) Vuelta a España
 3rd Prueba Villafranca de Ordizia
2015
 1st Klasika Primavera
2016
 3rd Circuito de Getxo
2017
 3rd Circuito de Getxo
 4th Prueba Villafranca de Ordizia
2019
 8th Overall Vuelta a Murcia
  Combativity award Stage 5 Vuelta a España

Grand Tour general classification results timeline

References

External links

Movistar Team profile

Cycling Quotient profile

Spanish male cyclists
1985 births
Living people
Sportspeople from the Province of Cuenca
Cyclists from Castilla-La Mancha